Margaret "Peggy" Carter is a fictional character in the Marvel Cinematic Universe (MCU) media franchise portrayed by Hayley Atwell, based on the Marvel Comics character of the same name. Carter is depicted as a British MI6 agent and member of the Strategic Scientific Reserve who became the love interest of Steve Rogers during World War II. Following the war, she goes on to become one of the founders of S.H.I.E.L.D., eventually serving as the Director. Atwell has received critical praise for her depiction of the character.

, the character has appeared in five films, as well as the short film Agent Carter (2013), the second season of Agents of S.H.I.E.L.D., and her own television series Agent Carter (2015–2016).

Alternate versions of the character named Captain Carter appear in the animated series What If...? (2021–present) and the film Doctor Strange in the Multiverse of Madness (2022). What If...? Carter receives the Super Soldier Serum instead of Rogers, and is later recruited by the Watcher to join the Guardians of the Multiverse in the battle against an alternate version of Ultron. Multiverse of Madness Captain Carter, also a supersoldier, is a member of the Illuminati from a reality called Earth-838.

Concept and creation 
The character debuted in a single panel (and unnamed) as a wartime love interest of Captain America in Tales of Suspense #75 (March 1966), and then receiving a name in #77 (May 1966). She was created by writer Stan Lee and artist Jack Kirby.

Hayley Atwell was cast in the role of Peggy Carter for Captain America: The First Avenger in April 2010.  Atwell expressed interest in reprising the role for Agent Carter in October 2013; ABC Entertainment president Paul Lee confirmed her involvement in the project in January 2014. Gabriella Graves portrays a young Carter in the television series Agent Carter through flashbacks. Regarding her preparation for the role, Atwell said, "I'm training at the moment six days a week to make her a bit more military and make it convincing that I could kick butt." On taking up the role of Carter, Atwell said "the main reason I did Captain America was because I wanted to get out of my own head and stop taking my work so seriously". Captain America: The First Avenger screenwriter Christopher Markus said the film "takes place in the 40s, there weren't too many women in areas of authority at that point, and we wanted her to essentially be the most capable person on the screen at that time".

Appearances 
 Peggy Carter first appears in Captain America: The First Avenger, which is set in the early 1940s during World War II. Working for the military, she falls in love with Steve Rogers, who has recently become Captain America. 
 She then appears in the Marvel One-Shot short film Agent Carter, which was packaged with the Iron Man 3 Blu-ray disc. The film takes place one year after the events of Captain America: The First Avenger, and features Carter as a member of the Strategic Scientific Reserve, searching for the mysterious Zodiac, and dealing with sexism.
 Hayley Atwell starred as Peggy Carter in the series Agent Carter. Set in the immediate post-war years following the events of Captain America: The First Avenger, the series depicts Carter's advancement from routine office work to a position as a celebrated and well-respected agent of the Strategic Scientific Reserve. In addition, she works with Howard Stark's butler Edwin Jarvis to uncover his framing at the hands of Leviathan. The series aired from January 6, 2015, until March 1, 2016.
 In the second season of Agent Carter, it is revealed that Carter had a brother, Michael (portrayed by Max Brown as an adult and Webb Baker Hayes as a boy), with whom she was very close. After Michael's death in World War II, Carter decides to leave her then-fiancé Fred Wells (portrayed by Kevin Changaris) to join the SSR. It is also revealed that Carter's mother, portrayed by Carole Ruggier, was named Amanda.
 In Captain America: The Winter Soldier, CGI was used to allow Atwell to reprise her role as the now 90 year old Carter when Rogers visits her in her retirement home in 2014.
 Hayley Atwell portrayed Peggy Carter in Agents of S.H.I.E.L.D.. She appears in the second-season premiere episode "Shadows" where she and the SSR raid a Hydra facility and arrest Werner Reinhardt and Hydra agents. Carter later appeared in the episode "The Things We Bury" where a flashback shows her interrogating Whitehall. In the season three episode "Emancipation", which occurs during the events of Captain America: Civil War, a newspaper headline is shown that says Agent Carter has died at the age of 95.
 She appears in Avengers: Age of Ultron in Rogers's 1940s hallucination caused by Wanda Maximoff.
 She appears in Ant-Man, in a 1989 flashback, aged in her late 70s, when Hank Pym resigns from S.H.I.E.L.D. after discovering that Mitchell Carson was trying to replicate Pym's shrinking formula without consent.
 She only appears in images in Captain America: Civil War, having died off-screen during the first act. Rogers serves as one of the pallbearers at her funeral and learns that Sharon Carter is her niece.
 She appears in Avengers: Endgame albeit in Rogers' compass photo of her, then in alternate timelines. She is seen working in her office in an alternate 1970 by Rogers. In an alternate 1949, she is reunited with Rogers and they get married.
 She appears in the first episode of the Disney+ animated series What If...? in an alternate universe. In this timeline, she receives the Super Soldier Serum and becomes a superhero named Captain Carter. In the ninth episode, she is recruited by the Watcher to join the Guardians of the Multiverse to stop an alternate Ultron. 
 A similar version of Captain Carter appears in Doctor Strange in the Multiverse of Madness (2022). In Earth-838, Carter serves as a member of the Illuminati and is killed when Wanda Maximoff throws Carter's shield at her, cutting her in half.

Fictional character biography

Early life 
Margaret Carter was born in 1921 to Amanda Carter. After the apparent death of her brother Michael in World War II, Carter decided to leave her then-fiancé Fred Wells to join MI6, being assigned to the Strategic Scientific Reserve (SSR).

Project Rebirth 

In 1943, Carter is tasked by the SSR to help oversee Project Rebirth, a program to create an army of supersoldiers for the United States war effort. Carter joins Howard Stark and Dr. Abraham Erskine in overseeing the program. After a series of tests on different soldiers, the sickly Steve Rogers is chosen due to his heroic character. Erskine subjects Rogers to the super-soldier treatment, injecting him with a Super Soldier Serum and dosing him with vita-rays.

After Rogers emerges from the experiment as a super soldier, an undercover Heinz Kruger, a Hydra agent, kills Erskine and flees with a vial of the serum. Rogers and Carter pursue Kruger; Carter nearly kills him but Rogers saves her from being hit by his vehicle. The assassin avoids interrogation by committing suicide with a cyanide capsule.

Helping Steve Rogers
After Rogers' best friend Bucky Barnes is captured by Hydra, Rogers has Carter and Howard Stark fly him behind enemy lines to mount a solo rescue attempt, which succeeds. After Rogers returns, Carter, who has developed feelings for him, catches him kissing another woman, prompting her to angrily fire bullets at Rogers' new shield. Using information extracted from Arnim Zola, the final Hydra stronghold is located, and Rogers leads an attack to stop Johann Schmidt from using weapons of mass destruction on major world cities. Rogers and Carter kiss and Rogers promises to go dancing with her, before Rogers climbs aboard Schmidt's aircraft as it takes off. After Schmidt is teleported to Vormir by the Tesseract, Rogers, seeing no way to land the plane without the risk of detonating its weapons, radios the tearful Carter and says goodbye to her before crashing in the Arctic. Stark later recovers the Tesseract from the ocean floor but is unable to locate Rogers or the aircraft, presuming him dead.

Post–World War II 

In 1945, Carter and the SSR raid the last known Hydra base led by Werner Reinhardt. They confiscate many items including the Obelisk and a blue body.

One year later, Carter faces sexism from her boss, Agent John Flynn, who treats her condescendingly and keeps her compiling data and code breaking while assigning field cases to the male agents. The SSR's main concern is the mysterious Zodiac, which they have been unable to recover for some time. One night alone in the office while the men are out together, Carter answers the case line to hear of the location of the Zodiac. Though three to five agents are recommended, Carter decides to go to the location herself. Fighting off multiple guards, Carter is able to retrieve the Zodiac, a mysterious serum, herself. The next day, Flynn reprimands her for not going through the proper procedures to complete the mission, and dismisses the indignant Carter as just an "old flame" of Captain America's who was given her current job out of pity for her bereavement. However, before he can officially punish her, the case line rings again, this time with Howard Stark on the other end, who informs Flynn that Carter will co-head the newly created S.H.I.E.L.D.

Later in 1946, Carter has to balance the routine office work she does for the SSR in New York City with secretly assisting Howard Stark, who finds himself framed for supplying deadly weapons to enemies of the United States. Carter is assisted by Stark's butler, Edwin Jarvis, to find those responsible and dispose of the weapons.

In 1947, Carter moves from New York City to Los Angeles to deal with the threats of the new Atomic Age by the Secret Empire in the aftermath of World War II, gaining new friends, a new home, and starting a romance with Daniel Sousa.

Director of S.H.I.E.L.D. and later life

Sometime later, Carter marries a man whom Steve Rogers saved from a Hydra base in World War II, and has two children with him. Carter's American niece Sharon Carter later becomes a S.H.I.E.L.D. agent. Meanwhile, Peggy Carter also conducts S.H.I.E.L.D. operations in collaboration with a man named "Braddock".

By 1970, Carter serves as the Director of S.H.I.E.L.D. In 1989, Carter witnesses a confrontation between Hank Pym and Howard Stark over Stark's use of Pym Particles without Pym's knowledge, causing Pym to quit S.H.I.E.L.D.

In 2014, the elderly Carter has developed Alzheimer's disease, and Rogers visits her, having come out of suspended animation a few years prior. Carter notes to Rogers that the world has changed. In 2016, Carter passes away in her sleep, and Sharon, Rogers and Sam Wilson attend her funeral.

Alternate versions

Reunited with Steve Rogers 

In 2023, after completing the Time Heist and returning the Infinity Stones to their correct places in the timeline, Rogers chooses to stay with Carter in an alternate 1949, with the two enjoying a full married life together.

What If...? 

In an alternate 1943, when Carter chooses to stay in the main theater instead of watching from a safe distance, Kruger attacks Project Rebirth before it starts and shoots Rogers, leading Carter to take the Super Soldier Serum herself. Carter, after attacking a Hydra convoy and successfully retrieving the Tesseract from Hydra leader Johann Schmidt, becomes the superhero Captain Carter, equipped with a vibranium shield that has a Union Jack style paint job. Rogers instead pilots the Hydra Stomper armor made by Howard Stark and powered by the Tesseract. Carter fights alongside Rogers to help the Allied Forces win World War II. In 1945, Rogers goes missing during an attack on a Hydra train, prompting Carter to interrogate Arnim Zola to learn the location of Schmidt's castle. They find him using the Tesseract to summon an interdimensional creature from a portal which kills him. Carter sacrifices herself by entering the portal while pushing the creature back into it.

Carter lands in S.H.I.E.L.D.'s warehouse, meeting Nick Fury and Clint Barton, who tell her the war ended almost 70 years ago. In 2014, Carter has befriended Natasha Romanoff and works for S.H.I.E.L.D., going on a mission to rescue the hijacked S.H.I.E.L.D. vessel Lemurian Star from Georges Batroc. While she duels Batroc, she is recruited by the Watcher to form the Guardians of the Multiverse to defeat Ultron, who plans to take control and destroy the entire multiverse. The Guardians and an apocalyptic version of Romanoff fight Ultron in his and Romanoff's home universe, and Carter exposes Ultron's eye by removing part of his helmet. This allows Romanoff to inject an Arnim Zola virus, wiping out Ultron's consciousness, destroying him. Carter is then returned to her universe by the Watcher. Back in her universe, Carter and Romanoff subdue Batroc, and then Romanoff informs her that the Hydra Stomper has been found with someone inside.

Earth-838 

In an alternate reality known as Earth-838, Captain Carter is a member of the Illuminati. When Thanos instigates the Infinity War, she and the Illuminati successfully defeat him using the Book of Vishanti. She is also present at the execution of 838-Stephen Strange, who became corrupted by the Darkhold. Carter and her fellow Illuminati debate what to do with Earth 616-Strange and America Chavez when they arrive on Earth-838. When their headquarters is attacked by 616-Wanda Maximoff, who has possessed the body of her Earth-838 counterpart, Carter is killed when she is bisected by her own shield.

Characterization 

About the character's debut in Captain America: The First Avenger, Atwell stated, "I likened her character to that famous Ginger Rogers quote. She can do everything Captain America can do, but backwards and in high heels. She's an English soldier through and through, although she always looks fabulous. She might stand there with a machine-gun shooting Nazis, but she's obviously gone to the loo beforehand and applied a bit of lipstick. She doesn't need to be rescued. That's exciting to me – her strength." She added, "I think she's quite stubborn, a slightly frustrated woman who struggles with being a woman in that time. But more importantly she's a modern woman and she sees something in Captain America that she relates to, and becomes kindred spirits. He treats her very differently to how she's been treated by lots of men, in this kind of dominated world she lives in. So she's very much a fighter."

Carter is the first female character to headline a standalone story as part of the MCU, ahead of popular comic characters such as Black Widow and Captain Marvel. Unlike other major Marvel heroes, Carter does not have any superpowers, instead the writers "always said her superpower is the fact that other people underestimate her. And she often uses that to her advantage". Atwell said it was "thrilling" to explore "the backdrop of this male-dominated world, where women are still in the workforce, unspoken for and struggling to find a place outside the home" and how it affects Carter, who must deal with this along with the missions she receives.

On the character starring in her own short film, the director of the Agent Carter short film Louis D'Esposito said that Marvel always wanted to do a Peggy Carter short since the character "was a fan-favorite and a Marvel Studios favorite". D'Esposito enjoyed the moment when Carter uses her compact to view the bad guy, which was ad libbed during filming, because "that's the essence of what she's about and what the film's about. Not only is she—especially in that time—a woman in a man's world, she still maintains her femininity".

Speaking about the influence that the apparent death of Steve Rogers has on Carter, Atwell explained that "It's only been a year and she's grieving him and I think what keeps her going is he was the greatest person she ever knew ... she's also determined to make sure that his work wasn't in vain." Following the first season, Atwell noted that Carter did not "win everyone's respect", with Jack Thompson taking credit for her actions, for example, but "she knows her value so she doesn't need that praise". For the second season, executive producer Michele Fazekas explained that after Carter "put a lot of things emotionally to bed", such as letting go of Captain America, she is now "more open to looking at her life and figuring out, does she want a relationship?" Fazekas added that Carter would start to realize that "not everybody has her ideals", even in the SSR.

Appearance 

For Carter's costumes, though some vintage pieces were used, most of her outfits were custom made to accommodate the scripted action scenes. Costume designer Giovanna Ottobre-Melton gave the outfits an "hourglass style with strength in the tailoring and defined shoulders, but not overly exaggerated." For the character's tactical gear, World War II underground military looks were referenced. On receiving the script for Captain America: The Winter Soldier, Atwell realized the character "would be 96, and I would be up to the eyeballs in prosthetics." The visual effects team was not satisfied with the initial make-up used to make Atwell look older, and eventually resorted to aging her through CGI methods.

Reception

Critical response 
Reviewing Captain America: The First Avenger, Christy Lemire of the Associated Press said, "Atwell’s gorgeous looks make her a great fit for the part, but her character is better developed than you might imagine; she’s no damsel in distress, waiting for Captain America to save her, but rather a trained fighter who is very much his equal." Roger Ebert of the Chicago Sun-Times felt that she resembled "a classic military pin-up of the period" with her depicted "full red lips" of the film.

Rosie Fletcher of Total Film noted that the Marvel One-Shot short film Agent Carter was well received by the audience at San Diego Comic Con, and praised Atwell's performance. Andy Hunsaker at Crave Online said the short "gives its title character the send-off she deserves", and hoped that it would lead to further female-focused properties from Marvel. IGNs Scott Collura called Atwell "the big-screen female superhero we've all been waiting for. She kicks so much ass in this short story with such aplomb, using not just brawn but also brains, and it's all very clever and fun." He felt the short seemed more of a proof-of-concept that female-based superhero projects could work, but that "Atwell never loses touch with her feminine side" either.

Brian Lowry, reviewing the two-part premiere of the TV series Agent Carter for Variety, felt that giving Atwell her own television series was "a pretty smart bet" by Marvel, and he called the episodes "considerable fun".

The A.V. Club named Atwell's performance as one of the "Best Individual Performances" of 2015.

Accolades

Notes

See also 
 Characters of the Marvel Cinematic Universe

References

External links 
 Peggy Carter on the Marvel Cinematic Universe Wiki
 Captain Carter on the Marvel Cinematic Universe Wiki
 
 Peggy Carter on Marvel.com

Agent Carter (TV series)
British female characters in television
British superheroes
Captain America (film series)
Captain America characters
Female characters in film
Female characters in television
Fictional British people
Fictional British secret agents
Fictional military captains
Fictional military personnel in films
Fictional Office of Strategic Services personnel
Fictional United States Army personnel
Fictional women soldiers and warriors
Fictional World War II veterans
Fictional female secret agents and spies
Fictional shield fighters
Fictional super soldiers
Film characters introduced in 2011
Marvel Cinematic Universe characters
Marvel Comics characters who can move at superhuman speeds
Marvel Comics characters with accelerated healing
Marvel Comics characters with superhuman strength
Marvel Comics female superheroes
Peggy Carter
S.H.I.E.L.D. agents
United Kingdom-themed superheroes